The smew (Mergellus albellus) is a species of duck and is the only living member of the genus Mergellus. Mergellus is a diminutive of Mergus and albellus is from Latin  albus "white". This genus is closely related to Mergus and is sometimes included in it, though it might be closer to the goldeneyes (Bucephala). The smew has hybridized with the common goldeneye (B. clangula).

A seaduck fossil from the Middle Miocene shows that birds similar to smew existed up to 13 million years ago. The extant species dates back to the Late Pleistocene.

Name
The term smew has been used since the 17th century and is of uncertain origin. It is believed to be related to the Dutch smient ("wigeon") and the German Schmeiente or  Schmünte, "wild duck." It is probably derived from smee, a dialectal term for a wild duck.

Description

The drake smew, with its 'cracked ice' or 'panda' appearance, is unmistakable, and looks very black-and-white in flight. The females and immature males are grey birds with chestnut foreheads and crowns, and can be confused at a distance with the ruddy duck; they are often known as "redhead" smew. It has oval white wing-patches in flight. The smew's bill has a hooked tip and serrated edges, which help it catch fish when it dives for them.

Distribution and ecology

This species breeds in the northern taiga of Europe and the Palearctic. It needs trees for breeding. The smew lives on fish-rich lakes and slow rivers. As a migrant, it leaves its breeding areas and winters on sheltered coasts or inland lakes of the Baltic Sea, the Black Sea, northern Germany and the Low Countries, with a small number reaching Great Britain (for example, at Dungeness), mostly at regular sites. Vagrants have been recorded in North America. On lakes it prefers areas around the edges, often under small trees. The smew breeds in May and lays 7–11 cream-colored eggs, incubated by the female for 26–28 days. Ducklings leave the nest soon after hatching and learn to fly within about 10 weeks.

It nests in tree holes, such as old woodpecker nests. It is a shy bird and flushes easily when disturbed.

The smew is one of the species to which the Agreement on the Conservation of African-Eurasian Migratory Waterbirds (AEWA) applies. It is not considered threatened on the IUCN Red List, though its population is decreasing.

Fossil history
An unnamed fossil seaduck, known from a humerus found in the Middle Miocene Sajóvölgyi Formation (Late Badenian, 13–12 million years ago) of Mátraszõlõs, Hungary, was assigned to Mergus. However, the authors included the smew therein, and consequently, the bone is more properly assigned to Mergellus—especially as it was more similar to a smew's than to the Bucephala remains also found at the site. It is sometimes argued that the Mátraszõlõs fossil is too old to represent any of the modern seaduck genera, but apparently these were all well-distinct even back then.

Subfossils from this species was also found in England indicate that the living species' range extended there a few thousand years ago.

Gallery

References

External links

 
 
 
 
 
 

Mergansers
Birds of Europe
Birds of Russia
Birds of North Asia
Birds described in 1758
Taxa named by Carl Linnaeus